The LT&SR 69 class was a class of 0-6-2T steam locomotives designed for freight work on the London, Tilbury and Southend Railway.  Six were initially built in 1903 to the design of Thomas Whitelegg, four more followed in 1908,  and a further four in 1912, after the LT&SR's takeover by the Midland Railway (MR) in that year, giving a total of 14. The Midland renumbered them 2180–2193, and all entered LMS stock upon the grouping of 1923.  The LMS renumbered them 2220–2233 in 1923, but then took them back to 2180–2193 in 1939.  In 1947 they were again renumbered 1980–1993 by the LMS, and in 1948 all were acquired by British Railways.   BR added 40000 to their numbers so they became 41980–41993.  Withdrawals started in 1958, and by 1959 all but 41981 had gone.  The last engine was withdrawn in 1962, and none of the small fleet were preserved.

List of locomotives

References 
 
 Bob Essery The London, Tilbury and Southend Railway and its Locomotives, OPC (2001) 
 Bob Essery and David Jenkinson An Illustrated History of LMS locomotives. Volume 4. Absorbed Pre-Group Classes Midland Division

External links 
  A photo of 73 Cranham is about a fifth of the way down this page

69
0-6-2T locomotives
NBL locomotives
Beyer, Peacock locomotives
Railway locomotives introduced in 1903
Standard gauge steam locomotives of Great Britain